Ugyen Dorji is a Bhutanese politician who has been a member of the National Assembly of Bhutan, since October 2018.

Education 
He holds a Master's degree in Industrial and Employment Relations from Monash University, Australia.

Political career 
Dorji was elected to the National Assembly of Bhutan as a candidate of DPT in the 2008 Bhutanese National Assembly election. He received 5,610 votes and defeated Mingbo Dukpa, a candidate of PDP.

He ran for the seat of the National Assembly of Bhutan as a candidate of DPT in the 2013 Bhutanese National Assembly election, but was unsuccessful. He received 2,205 votes and lost the seat to the same opponent Mingbo Dukpa.

Wangchuk was elected to the National Assembly of Bhutan as a candidate of DPT from Dewathang Gomdar constituency in 2018 Bhutanese National Assembly election. He received 5,367 votes and defeated Thinley Namgay, a candidate of DNT.

References 

1975 births
Living people
Bhutanese MNAs 2018–2023
Druk Phuensum Tshogpa politicians
Monash University alumni
Bhutanese MNAs 2008–2013
Druk Phuensum Tshogpa MNAs